For the Journey is the tenth studio album by progressive metal band Threshold. It is the fourth and last studio album to feature lead vocalist Damian Wilson, the second and last to feature second guitarist Pete Morten and their third album on their current label, Nuclear Blast. It is also their shortest studio album and the only one under 50 minutes in length.

Track listing

Personnel

Members 
Damian Wilson – lead vocals, backing vocals
Karl Groom – guitar, backing vocals
Richard West – keyboards, backing vocals
Johanne James – drums
Steve Anderson – bass guitar, backing vocals
Pete Morten – guitar

Production 
Karl Groom and Richard West – production
Karl Groom – mixing
Mika Jussila – mastering

References

2014 albums
Nuclear Blast albums
Threshold (band) albums